Yüksel Sariyar (born 1 August 1979) is an Austrian former professional footballer who played as a central midfielder.

Club career
Sariyar came through the youth ranks at Austria Wien but he made his professional debut at Gençlerbirliği before joining LASK Linz in 2000. After three years in Linz he returned to Turkey for a year and then played three more years at Pasching before returning to Austria Wien for the 2007–08 season.

Most commonly he plays as a central midfielder, but he has played as full back and right winger before.
In summer 2008, he left FK Austria Wien for newly formed Austrian second-division side Wiener Neustadt – who acquired the playing licence of Schwanenstadt for the 2008–09 campaign – and was joined by Austria Wien teammates Sanel Kuljic, Johannes Aigner and Sašo Fornezzi.

In January 2010 left Wiener Neustadt in the Austrian Second Division and signed for Slovak side DAC Dunajská Streda.

International career
He made his debut for Austria in February 2005 against Latvia and earned 13 caps, scoring one goal. He was however not considered for Austria's EURO 2008 squad.

References

1979 births
Living people
Footballers from Vienna
Austrian people of Turkish descent
Austrian footballers
Austrian expatriate footballers
Austria international footballers
Gençlerbirliği S.K. footballers
LASK players
Kocaelispor footballers
FK Austria Wien players
Austrian Football Bundesliga players
FC DAC 1904 Dunajská Streda players
Slovak Super Liga players
Expatriate footballers in Slovakia
Austrian expatriate sportspeople in Slovakia
Association football midfielders
Austrian football managers